Motijhil (also Motijheel, literal translation: Pearl Lake), also known as Company's Lake due to its association with the East India Company, is a horse-shoe shaped lake in Murshidabad, West Bengal, India.  It was created by Nawazish Muhammad Khan, the son-in-law of Nawab Alivardi Khan. He also constructed a precious palatial palace beside this lake which is called the Sang-i-Dalan (literal translation: Stone Palace) which is also known as the Motijhil Palace. It is located at the bend of this lake. It was used as the residence of Nawazish and Ghaseti Begum, Nawazish's beloved wife. It is said that after Nawazish died, Ghaseti Begum lived here until Nawab Siraj ud-Daulah took over the palace and seized the residents' in 1756 AD. With this money he built a similar lake with a beautiful palace, Hirajheel, on the opposite side of the Hooghly River. The palace has a lofty gateway, a mosque known as the "Shahamat Jang" and the Kala Masjid and some other buildings which were all built by Nawazish. This palace was built in 1740. As far as etymology is concerned, the palace has been named so as it was built using black basalt pillars which were brought from the ruins of Gaur. Thus, it was given the name of  Sang-i-Dalan or the Stone Palace. This palace was then decorated with different varieties of flower plants and precious marbles.

According to James Rennell Motijhil is a horse shoe shaped lake. Motijhil is situated about one and a half kilometers away from Murshidabad in the south and about three kilometres away from the Hazarduari Palace in the south east. It has been excavated on the former beds of the Bhagirathi River that once flowed near this lake. The river was much nearer in 1766 that now. At south there is a tank known as the Shanti Pukur. The offices were built on its banks.

Motijhil was also the residence of Warren Hastings from 1771 to 1773, when he became the political President at the court of the Nawab. It had also paid host to Robert Clive and John Shore, 1st Baron Teignmouth.

Kala Masjid

Kala Masjid or Jama Masjid, Motijheel is situated in the vicinity of the lake and was constructed in 1749–50 AD. The construction date is also mentioned in a Persian inscription which is embedded in the wall of the mosque.

The mosque is rectangular in plan and has three domes. The mosque rests on several octagonal drums which are plain and are devoid of any decoration and the domes are crowned by lotus and kalasha (pot) finials. It also has four octagonal minarets at the four corners which taper upwards and are topped by bulbous kiosks which are supported on slender pillars. The minaret shafts are decorated. The facade is also  ornamented. Three arched doorways on the east open to a prayer hall. A copy of the Quran, calligraphed by Nawazish Muhammad Khan himself is also kept preserved inside the mosque.

The plinth area of the mosque is 5986 square feet.

Opposite to this masjid on the east banks of the lake used to be an ornamented mosque known as the Raesh Bagh.

Motijheel lake and the structures in its vicinity are protected monuments and are looked after by the Archaeological Survey of India.

Tombs
East of the Kala Masjid are several enclosures which host the tombs of Nawazish Muhammad Khan, his adopted son Ekram-ud-Daula, Ekram's tutor, Ekram's nurse and Nawazish Khan's General, Shumsheree Ali Khan. The tombs of Ekram and Nawazish are made of marble and that of Shumsheree is made of sandstone. The grave of Ekram's tutor is made of black stone. Ekram was the younger brother of Nawab Siraj ud-Daulah.

To the west of the mosque and beyond the compound wall of the Motijhil Lake, stands a ruined royal gateway, also built by Nawazish Muhammad Khan.

Motijhil also hosts the grave of the son of Mr. Keating, Edward Keating. In 1774, Mr. Keating was the Superintendent of the Murshidabad Mint and later became the judge of the court of appeal. The slab embedded on the grave says that his son was born on 20 December 1779 and died on 3 March 1785 (aged 5 years, 2 months and 11 days).

New constructions
In 1758, after Siraj ud-Daulah's defeat in at the Battle of Plassey, Mir Jafar, who succeeded Siraj as the Nawab of Bengal, constructed a palace with 12 doors here and named it Bara Duari (the palace with twelve doors). Robert Clive is said to have lived here. He also stayed here to negotiate with the Nawabs for the transfer of the Diwani to the East India Company. On 29 April 1766 he held the first ceremony of beginning the revenue collections here with Clive as the Dewan, when Nazam-ud-Daulah was the Nawab.

References

External links
 
 

Tourist attractions in Murshidabad
Islamic rule in the Indian subcontinent
Lakes of West Bengal